Lisice may refer to:

Places 
Bosnia and Herzegovina
Lisice (Ljubuški)

Czech Republic
Lišice

North Macedonia
Lisiče, Čaška

Poland
Lisice, Greater Poland Voivodeship
Lisice, Masovian Voivodeship

Serbia
Lisice (Lučani)

Other uses 
Lisice (1969), a 1969 Yugoslav film
Liscice, a Serbian television show